Radkov is a municipality and village in Opava District in the Moravian-Silesian Region of the Czech Republic. It has about 500 inhabitants.

History
The first written mention of Radkov is from 1377.

Notable people
Harald Hauptmann (1936–2018), German archaeologist

References

External links

Villages in Opava District